"Unconditional Love" is the second single from Donna Summer's album, She Works Hard for the Money. The song was released in August 1983 by Mercury Records. It was written by Summer and Michael Omartian, produced by Omartian. Though uncredited, it also features vocals by British reggae act Musical Youth, who had scored a Top 10 Pop and R&B hit in the US with "Pass the Dutchie" earlier in 1983.

The song was a commercial disappointment, peaking at #43 on the Billboard Hot 100 and #40 on the Cashbox Chart, though it performed significantly better on the R&B chart (reaching the Top Ten). In the UK, it became Summer's fourteenth Top 20 single, reaching a peak position of No.14. The song also peak #26 in Spain Radio chart.

Cash Box called the "purity and innocence" of the song "a bright departure [for Summers] and complete success."

The song was edited from the original album version for its release on the 7" single format. The 12" single featured an extended remix clocking in at 5:20.

Music video
The music video for "Unconditional Love" was popular on MTV. In the video, Summer plays a school teacher, and the reggae group Musical Youth are members of the class. After the class is over, Summer removes her heavy fur coat, revealing a tight blue glittery nightclub singer outfit, and goes outside, singing with all the students in the school. The local school who were invited to be a part of the Music video was King Athelstan Primary School and the school the filming took place was the Bonner Hill Road Girls School before it was demolished.

Track listing
A. "Unconditional Love" (Club Mix) 5:20

B. "She Works Hard For The Money" (Club Mix) 6:00

A. "Unconditional Love" (Club Mix) 5:20

B. "Unconditional Love" (Instrumental) 4:40

In popular culture
 In 2018, the song was included in the Broadway musical Summer: The Donna Summer Musical.

Cover Versions
In 1986 Christian punk band Altar Boys recorded a cover of Unconditional Love on their album  Gut Level Music.

References

Donna Summer songs
1983 singles
Songs written by Donna Summer
Songs written by Michael Omartian
Song recordings produced by Michael Omartian
Dance-pop songs
1983 songs
Reggae songs
Mercury Records singles